In geology, aquatic succession is the process in which a glacial lake dries up. Over the lifespan of a glacier it dissolves into a body of water. Aquatic succession is the continuing step of that solid water-turned-lake melting into the ground and further disappearing into limbo. The lakes sometime become underground lakes or rivers. The water tends to remain part of the local hydrosphere by percolating into aquifers.

Glaciology